Zinc finger protein 516 is a protein that in humans is encoded by the ZNF516 gene.

Function 

Zinc-finger proteins bind nucleic acids and play important roles in various cellular functions, including cell proliferation, differentiation, and apoptosis. This gene encodes a zinc-finger protein, and belongs to the Krüppel C2H2-type zinc-finger protein family. It may be involved in transcriptional regulation.

References

Further reading